Jalan Sultan Abdul Samad (Selangor state route B58) is a major road in Selangor, Malaysia. It was named after Sultan Abdul Samad of Selangor who ruled Jugra until his death on 1898. It is a main route to Bandar Jugra, a former capital of Selangor.

List of junctions

Roads in Selangor